John Brunton may refer to:
 John Brunton (actor) (1741–1822), English actor
 John Brunton (manufacturer) (1837–1917), Scottish manufacturer and philanthropist 
 John Brunton (scenic artist) (1849–1909), Scottish scenic artist
 John Brunton (cricketer) (1869–1962), English cricketer